Mickey Durrng Garrawurra (1940–2006), usually referred to as Mickey Durrng, was an Aboriginal Australian artist known for his natural ochres and pigments on paper, bark, and logs.

Biography 
Mickey Durrng Garrawurra was born  in eastern Arnhem Land. He spent the majority of his life at Langarra on Howard Island, which is located in the Arafura Sea. Durrng died in 2006 in his home in Millingimbi.

The Garrawurra men have a long history of being expert artists. Mickey is just one in the long list of exceptional Garrawurra artists and persons. Durrng is one of "the best-known artists using classic Garrawurra designs that include bush turkey and the classic body-painting striped design known as kingfisher".

"Durrng was one of the last senior men of the great Garrawurra family of ‘seven fathers’. Durrng’s grandfather sired seven sons, of whom Durrng’s father Nupurray Garrawurra was the youngest." He was a member of the Dhuwa moiety and an elder of the Liyagawumirr clan of Yolngu people. His language group is Buyuyukulmirr/Liyagalawumirr. When nearing his death, Durrng's role as elder was to select the person who would carry on the traditions, and he selected his sister Ruth Nalmakarra.

Career 
Durrng made a career out of painting with pigments and natural ochres on paper. His career in aboriginal art is extensive  and has made a profound impact on the Aboriginal art world. Durrng's works are a detailed description of ancestral beings, stories, and lessons. A majority of his works are centered around the stories of the Djan'kawu sisters and clan designs. Durrng's most profitable piece to date is Oysters and Waterholes which sold for US$4,298.

Durrng's "first bold red, yellow, and white striped Djang'kawu painting" was inspired by a work from Paddy Dhathangu. This painting was the first time the ceremonial design was not on a person or 3-dimensional object. This novel piece led to his first commission from Perspecta 1992 at the Art  Gallery of New South Wales.

It was not until 1997 that Durrng finally left his family and homeland to travel to Melbourne for his first art exhibition. After 1997 and until his death, Durrng travelled to both Canada and the United States a multitude of times to display his works at art exhibits.

In regard to his works which are typically riddled with water holes, stripes, and natural pigments, he claims that "stripes are the authority...colours hold the power of the earth. Sun, water, creation, for everything."

For an extended period of time, Durrng and his brother Tony Dhanyala were the only people authorised to paint the Liyagauwumirr’s most important clan designs: the Djirri-didi painted on the body during the Ngarra cleansing ceremony. These designs are made up of stripes and circles that tell the stories of their ancestors. Dhanyala died two years before Durrng, and just before Durrng's death he gave the rights to his sister, Ruth Nalmakarra and her family, to draw and paint their clan designs.

Durrng first gained popularity in the early 1990s when he started painting the Djirri-didi on bark. His popularity was birthed out of the organized rigidity that had been absent in previously successful Aboriginal art from Arnhem Land.

Critics often claimed that is work was influenced by modern art movements and strayed from the traditional work that has always come from Arnhem Land; however, Durrng's works were only representations of the paintings on the bodies during the Ngarra ceremony which is described as "a mortuary rite performed to remember the dead and to prepare their spirits for the afterlife, [and] is also a celebration of regeneration and renewal that recalls the ancestral travels of the Djan'kawu Sisters".

Collections 

Art Gallery of New South Wales
Kluge-Ruhe Aboriginal Art Collection of the University of Virginia
Linden Museum Stuttgart, Germany
Museum of Contemporary Art, Sydney
National Gallery of Australia
National Gallery of Victoria
Queensland Art Gallery

References 

Australian Aboriginal artists
People from the Northern Territory
Australian contemporary artists
1940 births
2006 deaths
Australian Aboriginal elders